QCWA may stand for:

 Quarter Century Wireless Association
 Queensland Country Women's Association, women's organisation in Australia